The Sisters are two small rock islands in San Pablo Bay, located  northeast of Point San Pedro in Marin County, California.

The Sisters were shown in an 1850 survey map of the San Francisco Bay area made by Cadwalader Ringgold. They, along with The Brothers on the opposite side of the San Pablo Strait, were reserved for military purposes by order of President Andrew Johnson in 1867. After many a court battle the plans were scrapped.

See also 

 Islands of San Francisco Bay

References

Islands of Marin County, California
San Pablo Bay
Islands of San Francisco Bay
Islands of Northern California
Uninhabited islands of California